Going Deep with David Rees is an American television program.

The first season was shown on the National Geographic Channel. The program is hosted by David Rees, and explores everyday things that we take for granted. It began in the summer of 2014. The second season premiered on Esquire Network on November 11, 2015.

Episodes

Season 1 (2014)

Season 2 (2015)

References

External links 

National Geographic Channel

2014 American television series debuts
National Geographic (American TV channel) original programming
Works by David Rees (cartoonist)